Maria Aparecida Souza Alves (born 7 July 1993), usually known as Maria Alves and sometimes simply as Maria, is a Brazilian footballer who plays as a forward for Flamengo and the Brazil women's national team. She previously played for Italian Serie A club Juventus FC.

International career
Maria Alves represented Brazil at the 2012 FIFA U-20 Women's World Cup. She made her senior debut in 2017.

Honours
Centro Olímpico
 Campeonato Brasileiro: 2013

São José
 International Women's Club Championship: 2014
 Copa Libertadores Femenina: 2014

Santos
 Campeonato Brasileiro de Futebol Feminino: 2017
 Campeonato Paulista: 2018

Juventus
 Serie A: 2019–20, 2020–21
 Coppa Italia: 2018–19
 Supercoppa Italiana: 2019, 2020–21

References

External links

1993 births
Living people
Women's association football midfielders
Women's association football forwards
Brazilian women's footballers
Sportspeople from Piauí
Brazil women's international footballers
Associação Desportiva Centro Olímpico players
São José Esporte Clube (women) players
Santos FC (women) players
Serie A (women's football) players
Juventus F.C. (women) players
Clube de Regatas do Flamengo (women) players
Brazilian expatriate women's footballers
Brazilian expatriate sportspeople in Italy
Expatriate women's footballers in Italy
Sociedade Esportiva Palmeiras (women) players